William Jack Lancaster (born 3 August 2002) is an English professional footballer who plays as a midfielder for  club Bradford (Park Avenue), on loan from  club Barnsley.

Career
Lancaster entered the Academy at Barnsley in June 2010, having been affiliated with the club since the age of seven. He signed as a first-year scholar in July 2018 and made his debut for the under-23 team in August 2019. He turned professional at the club in June 2021. On 5 March 2022, he joined Northern Premier League Premier Division club Whitby Town on loan, having impressed Barnsley youth-team coach Martin Devaney. He played three games as a substitute. He signed an extended contract at Barnsley in July 2022.

He made his first-team debut on 20 September 2022, coming on for Nicky Cadden as a half-time substitute in a 2–0 win over Newcastle United U21 in an EFL Trophy group stage game at Oakwell. On 4 November 2022, he joined National League North club Bradford (Park Avenue) on a one-month loan deal.

Style of play

Career statistics

References

2002 births
Living people
Footballers from Sheffield
English footballers
Association football midfielders
English Football League players
Northern Premier League players
National League (English football) players
Barnsley F.C. players
Whitby Town F.C. players
Bradford (Park Avenue) A.F.C. players